The Daytime Emmy Award for Outstanding Supporting Actor in a Drama Series  is an award presented annually by the National Academy of Television Arts and Sciences (NATAS) and Academy of Television Arts & Sciences (ATAS).  It is given to honor an actor who has delivered an outstanding performance in a supporting role while working within the daytime drama industry.

At  the 6th Daytime Emmy Awards held in 1979, Peter Hansen was the first winner of this award  for his portrayal of  Lee Baldwin on General Hospital. The awards ceremony was not televised in 1983 and 1984, having been criticized for voting integrity. Following the introduction of a new category in 1985, Outstanding Younger Actor in a Drama Series, the criteria for this category was altered, requiring all actors to be aged 26 or above.

Since its inception, the award has been given to 34 actors. General Hospital  is the show with the most awarded actors, with a total of twelve wins. In 1983, Darnell Williams became the first African-American to have garnered the award, winning for his role as  Jesse Hubbard on All My Children. Since 1994, Justin Deas holds the most wins with a total of four awards for his work on As the World Turns, Santa Barbara and Guiding Light.  With seven each, Jerry Ver Dorn had been tied with Deas for the most nominations since 2005. In 2009, Jeff Branson and Vincent Irizarry tied for the award, which was the first tie in this category. 

As of the 2022 ceremony, Jeff Kober is the most recent winner in this category for his role as Cyrus Renault on General Hospital.

Winners and nominees

Listed below are the winners of the award for each year, as well as the other nominees.

1970s

1980s

1990s

2000s

2010s

2020s

Multiple wins and nominations

The following individuals received two or more wins in this category:

The following individuals received two or more nominations in this category:

Series with most awards

References

External links
 

Awards established in 1979
Daytime Emmy Awards
Emmy